Marvel Super Hero Squad: Comic Combat is a video game that uses the uDraw GameTablet, developed by Griptonite Games, and published by THQ. The game is the third in the Marvel Super Hero Squad franchise, acting as the sequel to two video games Marvel Super Hero Squad and Marvel Super Hero Squad: The Infinity Gauntlet. It was released on November 15, 2011 for the PlayStation 3, Xbox 360, and Wii game systems.

Based on characters from Marvel comic books such as Thor and Iron Man, Marvel Super Hero Squad: Comic Combat revolves around Doom and his evil minions planning to find a way into the real world to steal the uDraw GameTablet and use it to take over the comic book universe.

Gameplay
Designed to be played with the uDraw GameTablet, the tablet helps players with attacks, weapons and barricades. Players use the stylus pen to draw their own attacks in order to stop Doom and his evil cohorts.
Players choose from 10 "Squaddies" based on characters from Marvel comic books, including Iron Man, Thor, Hulk, Wolverine, Falcon, Scarlet Witch, Reptil, Captain America, Invisible Woman, and Squirrel Girl (who has not appeared on the T.V. series). Players also solve unique puzzles using the tablet to defeat Doctor Doom. Major Marvel Comics antagonists such as MODOK, Abomination and Red Skull are portrayed as the main villains of Comic Combat.

Featured locations include the S.H.I.E.L.D. Helicarrier, the Baxter Building, the Vault and the Sanctum Sanctorum. Shaking the uDraw GameTablet will cause a massive in-game earthquake. The game includes a total of six comic book-designed stages and additionally players can earn "hero points", that can be used to upgrade all ten characters.

References

2011 video games
Beat 'em ups
Drawing video games
Fighting games
Griptonite Games
PlayStation 3 games
Single-player video games
Superhero video games
THQ games
Video game sequels
Video games based on Marvel Comics
Video games scored by Mick Gordon
Wii games
Xbox 360 games
Video games developed in the United States